Hermann Josef Hack (born 20 June 1956 in Hoevel/Bad Honnef, North Rhine-Westphalia), is a German artist, founder of the Global Brainstorming Project (1991), a platform to provide communication of researchers, scientists with the general public by the means of art. Influenced by his teacher Joseph Beuys, Hack develops the social sculpture ("Soziale Plastik") of Beuys with a global aspect and is the first to import it into the cyberspace dimension. Hack's large paintings on tarpaulin and works on paper deal with the challenges of global change and their cultural, social dimensions. Hack was one of the first media artists using the Internet, one of the most famous projects is the virtual roof,  where everybody could get a piece of the sky above a German city. Public interventions with the World Climate Refugee Camp, a model camp made of 1.000 miniature tents, since 2007 to visualize the plight of millions of climate refugees in the center of European cities.

References

Kunstforum International, Band 199

External links
Homepage
 http://greeninc.blogs.nytimes.com/2009/10/23/Europe-is-divided-over-climate-payments/  The New York Times announces Hack's art intervention in cooperation with Oxfam
 https://www.tagesschau.de/multimedia/video/video497648.html
 https://web.archive.org/web/20091216060121/http://www.art-magazin.de/kunst/19426/hermann_josef_hack_interview
 http://www.woostercollective.com/2009/01/hermann_josef_hacks_climate_refugee_camp.html
 http://www.art-magazin.de/kunst/14834/transmediale_2009_berlin
 http://www.spiegel.de/video/video-48469.html
 https://www.youtube.com/watch?v=ZhME4IYkn7U
 http://tagr.tv/2009/the-whole-world-is-a-climate-refugee-camp
 http://www.stattbad.net

www.hack-roof.de
 https://web.archive.org/web/20110721130008/http://www2.kah-bonn.de/ei/hack/0.htm
 https://web.archive.org/web/20091107071002/http://www2.kah-bonn.de/1/16/li.htm.

1956 births
Living people
People from Bad Honnef
German artists
Recipients of the Cross of the Order of Merit of the Federal Republic of Germany